
Gmina Przytoczna is a rural gmina (administrative district) in Międzyrzecz County, Lubusz Voivodeship, in western Poland.

The gmina contains part of the protected area called Pszczew Landscape Park.

Villages
Gmina Przytoczna contains the villages and settlements of Chełmicko, Chełmsko, Dębówko, Dziubielewo, Gaj, Goraj, Krasne Dłusko, Krobielewo, Lubikówko, Lubikowo, Murowiec, Nowa Niedrzwica, Nowiny, Orłowce, Poręba, Przytoczna, Rokitno, Strychy, Stryszewo, Twierdzielewo, Wierzbno and Żabno.

Neighbouring gminas
Gmina Przytoczna is bordered by the gminas of Bledzew, Międzychód, Międzyrzecz, Pszczew and Skwierzyna.

Twin towns – sister cities

Gmina Przytoczna is twinned with:
 Wusterhausen, Germany

References

Przytoczna
Międzyrzecz County